Presidential elections were held in the Maldives on 28 July 1978. The election took the form of a referendum on the candidacy of Maumoon Abdul Gayoom, who was elected with 92.96% of the vote.

Background
Ibrahim Nasir had been elected President in 1973. Two years later he deposed Prime Minister Ahmed Zaki, who was seen as a threat due to his popularity, in a bloodless coup and banished him to a remote island.

The islands had begun to suffer economic problems during the 1970s, following the collapse of the Sri Lankan market for dried fish, the islands' main export, and the closure of the British air base RAF Gan. As a result, the Nasir regime began to lose popularity, and in 1978 he fled to Singapore, with a subsequent investigation revealing that he had taken with him several million dollars from the national treasury.

Results

References

Maldives
1978 in the Maldives
Presidential elections in the Maldives
Referendums in the Maldives
Maldives
Single-candidate elections
July 1978 events in Asia
Election and referendum articles with incomplete results